Major General Sir Charles William Gwynn, KCB, CMG, DSO, FRGS (4 February 1870 – 12 February 1963) was an Irish born British Army officer, geographer, explorer and author of works on military history and theory.

Birth and education
Charles William Gwynn was the fourth son of John Gwynn (1827–1917), Regius Professor of Divinity at Trinity College, Dublin, and his wife, Lucy Josephine (1840–1907) daughter of the Irish nationalist William Smith O'Brien. He was born at Ramelton, County Donegal, while his father was rector of the local church. He was educated at St. Columba's College, Dublin and at the Royal Military Academy, Woolwich.

Military career
Gwynn was commissioned a second lieutenant in the Royal Engineers on 15 February 1889. 

Promoted to lieutenant on 15 February 1892, he saw active service in West Africa 1893–94 in operations against the Sofas, and in 1897 joined the geographical section of the Intelligence Branch of the War Office. Following the reconquest of Sudan from the Mahdi, Gwynn undertook survey work there, remaining until 1904. He was promoted to captain on 15 February 1900, received a brevet promotion to major on the following day, and was appointed a Companion of the Order of St Michael and St George (CMG) for his survey work determining the Ethiopia-Sudan controversial border. He attended the Staff College, Camberley from 1905 to 1906.

In June 1911, he was detailed to Australia as an instructor at the Royal Military College, Duntroon, where he served as the director of military art, instructing cadets in tactics, strategy and military history, with the local rank of lieutenant colonel. During much of his time there he acted as Commandant while the head of the College, Brigadier General W.T. Bridges, was away on tour. With the outbreak of World War I, he returned to England, where he unsuccessfully sought a posting to France. In July 1915, he was sent to the Middle East and was appointed General staff Officer Grade 1 (GSO1) of the Australian 2nd Division at Gallipoli. He was eventually posted to serve as the Chief of Staff of the II Anzac Corps, a position he held until the end of the war. He was present at the battle of Messines in June 1917. His brother, Stephen, and Stephen's son, Dennis, also served in the Great War.

Gwynn was appointed a Companion of the Order of the Bath in 1918. During the Great War he was mentioned in dispatches six times, received the brevet ranks of lieutenant-colonel and colonel, and was awarded the Belgian Croix de Guerre and the French Légion d'honneur.
 
After World War I, he served in a variety of staff assignments, culminating in May 1926 when he was made Commandant of the Staff College, Camberley. Upon his retirement in 1931, he was appointed a Knight Commander of the Order of the Bath.

Later life
After his retirement, in 1934, Major General Gwynn wrote Imperial Policing, now regarded as a classic in the field of low intensity conflict and small wars.

Family
In 1904 Gwynn married Mary ("Molly") Armstrong, widow of Lieutenant Lowry Armstrong of the Royal Navy. Molly Gwynn had a daughter by her first husband, named Margery Armstrong. Charles Gwynn had no children. Molly Gwynn died in 1951. Charles Gwynn spent his final years in Dublin, where he died in 1963 at the age of 93.

Personal characteristics
Gwynn was of medium height and wiry in build. He had a slight stammer.

Publications by Charles Gwynn
The Frontiers of Abyssinia: a retrospect Journal of the Royal African Society, Vol. 36, No. 143 (Apr. 1937), pp. 150–161
Imperial Policing London: Macmillan, 1934
The Second Great War: A Standard History (9 volumes, The Waverley Book Company Ltd in association with The Amalgamated Press, 1939-1946, edited by Sir John Hammerton), as Military Editor.

Photographs

References

External links
British Army Officers 1939−1945
Imperial Policing

1870 births
1963 deaths
Military personnel from County Donegal
British Army major generals
Knights Commander of the Order of the Bath
Companions of the Order of St Michael and St George
Companions of the Distinguished Service Order
Fellows of the Royal Geographical Society
English explorers
Explorers of Africa
Irish people of World War I
British Army personnel of World War I
People from County Down
Royal Engineers officers
Graduates of the Staff College, Camberley
Graduates of the Royal Military Academy, Woolwich
Commandants of the Staff College, Camberley